Pothy is a small town near Thalayolaparambu, Kottayam district in Kerala, India. It is 2 km from Thalayolaparambu, 10 km from Vaikom, and 35 km from Ernakulam and Kottayam. Kottayam-Eranakulam railway line is passes through Pothy. Mercy Hospital, St. Michael's Church, Little Flower UP and Holy family LP school, Devaswom Board college, a Maha Vishnu temple, Pattupurackal Devi Temple, and Thrikkarayikkulam Mahadeva Temple are in Pothy. 

Sevagram, a rehabilitation centre for orphan children, is also in Pothy.

References

Villages in Kottayam district